Roxanne Arlen (born Roxanne Giles; January 10, 1931 – February 22, 1989) was an American film and stage actress and model active in the 1950s and 1960s.

Early years 
Arlen was born Roxanne Giles on January 10, 1931, in Detroit, Michigan. Her father was Harry Giles, a chemist in Detroit. She graduated from Highland Park High School when she was 16 and took drama classes at night at Wayne State University while she was in high school. A modeling contest at the Fox Theater in Detroit led to her career as an actress.

Career 
On Broadway Arlen portrayed Gloria Coogle in Who Was That Lady I Saw You With? (1958).

Arlen left show business when she found herself being groomed for a sex-goddess role like that of Marilyn Monroe.

Personal life 
Arlen was married to Red Buttons from 1947 to 1949, Milton Gilman from 1949 to 1954, and Tom Roddy from 1954 to 1957. All three marriages ended in divorce. She married William Shafer in 1960, and they had a daughter. In the 1970s she began writing a play. 

She died in London, England, on February 22, 1989.

Filmography

Feature films
The Loved One (1965) as Wispering Glades hostess
A House Is Not a Home (1964) as Hattie's girl
Gypsy (1962) as ElectraBachelor Flat (1962) as Mrs. RobertsSlim Carter (1957) as Cigarette girlThe Big Caper (1957) as DollThe Young Stranger (1957) as CarhopThe Best Things in Life Are Free (1956) as Perky NicholsEverything but the Truth (1956) as BlondeMiracle in the Rain (1956) as Red-headed secretaryBundle of Joy (1956) as BlondeHot Rod Girl (1956) as Long PlaySon of Sinbad (1955) as RaiderBattle Cry (1955) as BlondeIllegal'' (1955) as Miss Hathaway

References

External links
 
 

1931 births
1989 deaths
20th-century American actresses
Actresses from Michigan
American female models
American film actresses
American television actresses
People from Detroit
Broadway theatre people